Voronezh Aircraft Production Association (VASO in English, BACO in Russian, Воронежское акционерное самолётостроительное общество, literally Society of Voronezh Joint-Ownership Aircraft Builders) is one of the largest aircraft production plants in Russia.

History
Founded in 1932 in Voronezh (as Voronezh Aviation Plant, branch registry number 18). In 2007, VASO became part of the state-owned United Aircraft Corporation (UAC).
Notable planes built here are the An-148 (never was commercially built, failed), Tu-28 (until 1970), Tu-144 (16 were made in 1967-1983), Il-86 (built until the end of the USSR), Il-96 (still in production with less than 1 unit per year), Il-28 (ended in 1970), ANT-25 pre-WWII plane), TB-3(WWII plane), Il-2 (WWII plane), Tu-16 (was built in the middle of the 20th century, retired during USSR) and some others.

In July 2009, UAC said it will invest 5 billion rubles ($162 mln) in the modernization of VASO's facilities. According to UAC, VASO will build 5 An-148 passenger aircraft in 2009, 18 in 2010, 36 in 2011, and 50 planes would be made annually from 2013 onwards.

Between 2008 and 2015, it produced some parts for an Airbus A320 and the A380.

In 1993, the aircraft plant started to develop two new updates to old Soviet models, the wide-body aircraft Il-96-400M and Il-112V. However, the yearly revenue of the plant is lower than the average price of one wide-body airliner.

Ownership structure
 JSC “Ilyushin Interstate Aircraft-Building Company” (30.0% of the shares)
 JSC “Ilyushin Aviation Complex” (27.1% of the shares)
 Private shareholders (42.9% of the shares)

Notes

References

External links
 Official website of VASO 
 Voronezh aircraft production association

 
1932 establishments in the Soviet Union
United Aircraft Corporation
Vehicle manufacturing companies established in 1932
Companies formerly listed on the Moscow Exchange
Aircraft manufacturers of the Soviet Union